Skibniew-Kurcze  is a village  situated in the administrative district of Gmina Sokołów Podlaski, within Sokołów County, Masovian Voivodeship in east-central Poland.

References

Skibniew-Kurcze